Gabriel Maralngurra (born 1968) is an Aboriginal Australian artist from the Ngalangbali clan in West Arnhem Land. He is well-known and respected within his community for the wide range of responsibilities he takes on. His artwork is displayed in various collections including the Australia Museum, Museum Victoria, and the Kluge-Ruhe Aboriginal Art Collection of the University of Virginia.

Early life
Born and raised in Kunbarlanja, Maralngurra is the oldest of seven children. He recalls his father, William Maralngurra, teaching him impactful Dreaming legends when growing up. In Aboriginal Australian cultures, Dreaming is the word used to explain the origin of life, cultural values, and law of the regions. It is these stories that have been passed down from his ancestry that have greatly influenced his art.

Career 
Maralngurra is known for working with ochre on paper, as well as keeping the traditional forms of rock art, while combining new innovative techniques. The purpose of many of his paintings are to draw the attention of non-Indigenous viewers who do not understand or even realize his culture exists. Additionally, his art work aims to ensure that the tradition and practice of painting in the Arnhem Land is not lost, but passed down to the younger generations. In doing this, Maralngurra employs innovative techniques when passing down stories, traditions, and practices of his culture in the Arnhem Land. He does this specifically through expressing his relationship with the natural world.

One of Maralngurra's most notable achievements includes being one of the founding members of Injalak Arts in the 1980s. Injalak Hill remains a centre for tourism due to its decorated rock art galleries dating back over 40,000 years ago. It is these traditional rock art paintings that continue to inspire Maralngurra's paintings. His artworks often illustrate local fauna, spirit figures such as the Mimih spirit, and Dreaming narratives (or djang). However, he always finds a way to add his own narrative flair and eternal coherence that is unique to art in the Arnhem Land.

He attributes most of his painting education to his elder, Thompson Yulidijirri, who has always played an important role in the teaching of younger generations. He has picked up on many of his painting techniques such as the x-ray and rarrk (cross-hatching) technique, and has taught Maralngurra how to combine traditional and non-traditional techniques to empower their communities.

Contact paintings 
In more recent years, Maralngurra has decided to venture into colonial paintings known as “contact paintings” in which he attempts to connect the past and the present and mimic western styles he is not as familiar with. These pieces exhibit the coming together of different cultures and recognize the differences between each other's communities. Although seemingly different, this still follows Maralngurra's tendency to use art as a way of educating others and fill the gap between different communities. Specifically, in this series of paintings, he focuses on depicting Baldwin Spencer, who was the first anthropologist to visit the region of the Western Arnhem Land. By doing this, art historian Henry Skerritt argues, Maralngurra is drawing attention to "the limits of communication and boundaries of exchange of visitors to his region."

Some of his most notable contact paintings include Meeting of Bininj Elders and Balanda Visitors in 1948 (1948), Baldwin Spencer and Paddy Cahill (2003), and Bininj at the rock Art Shelter (2006). Many of these paintings were displayed at his solo exhibition 'Contact' at the Mossenson Galleries in Melbourne in 2006.

Charlottesville exhibition 
During the 2020 Charlottesville takeover, Maralngurra and Joe Guymala visited Charlottesville to talk about and display their works in various locations across the city. This citywide exhibition consisted of more than 50 artists, five different locations, and about 200 pieces. One of the main centers for Aboriginal art in the world lies in the center of Charlottesville: the Kluge-Rhue Aboriginal Art Collection. The Kluge-Rhue has been opened since 1997 and is the only museum of Aboriginal art that stands outside of Australia. It includes more than 2000 pieces of Indigenous art, and each year invites Aboriginal artists from various regions to visit, lead workshops, and provide classes to locals and UVA students. This was just one of the many locations the citywide exhibition took place.  

Maralngurra played a large role in the exhibition located in the Fralin Museum located on the Grounds of the University of Virginia. Specifically, the exhibition located in the Fralin Museum, The Inside World: Contemporary Aboriginal Australian Memorial Poles consisted of 112 memorial poles by 55 different artists from various regions of the Arnhem Land. The memorial poles served the purpose of hollow coffins decorated with clan designs and signified the moment when the spirit of the deceased had finally returned home.  Maralngurra participated in a group of six memorial poles from his region that were done using Earth pigments on wood and included images such as the mimih spirit. However, it is important to recognize that the art is not only in the painting on the wooden logs, but also the difficult process of harvesting the logs. According to Maralngurra, the purpose of bringing this work to Charlottesville is to share and promote their strong culture from the other side of the world.

Additionally, Maralngurra displayed another piece of rock art style called "Kunwardde Bim Kakukyime" that hung on the walls of the historic building, the Rotunda, on the University of Virginia's Grounds. This piece is the perfect example of how Maralngurra incorporates local figures such as the brolga bird and the mimih spirit to further connect his artwork to his country and its inhabitants. Kunwardde Bim Kakukyime (Rock Art Style) illustrates a wide range of overlapping animals specific to his region in various shades of red, white, yellow, and even some blue. The brolga bird positioned slightly left of the centre of the image is known to be a hunting prize for the people in his community. He executes this depiction of the bird in x-ray style, meaning he includes the imagery of the internal organs and bone structure of the animal. The incorporation of the anatomical features of the bird proves how well connected he is with the inhabitants of his land. Additionally, in the bottom left corner, he includes a Mimih Spirit which is said to have taught his people many of the skills they would have needed to survive such as hunting. This organised chaos shows how he uses a variety of figures and colours to represent the identity of his community in a unique way.

Other roles
Maralngurra is also a tour guide, translator, Injalak Hill Board member and president. His strong presence in Australia has led him to travel often throughout the region and abroad for the past twenty-five years.

Awards 
2006: Wilin Centre Award for Outstanding Indigenous Artist for his exhibition Making Contact
2010: Telstra Indigenous Art Awards - Highly Commended for "Wurdwurd (children) Kudjekbinj Dreaming"

Collections 

National Museum of Australia
 Department of Foreign Affairs, Canberra
Museum and Art Gallery of the Northern Territory
Museum Victoria
Batchelor Institute, N.T.
Berndt Museum of Anthropology, University of Western Australia
Kluge-Ruhe Aboriginal Art Collection of the University of Virginia

Significant Exhibitions 

 2020 Munguyhmunguyh (Forever): Celebrating the 30th Anniversary of the John W. Kluge Injalak Commission, The Upper West Oval Room of The Rotunda at the University of Virginia
2019-2020 The Inside World: Contemporary Aboriginal Australian Memorial Poles. Nevada Museum of Art, Reno, NV; Charles H. Wright Museum of African American History, Detroit, MI; The Fralin Museum of Art, University of Virginia, Charlottesville, VA; Frost Art Museum, Florida International University, Miami, FL.
2018 'Manme Manmak' Good Food! Central Craft's June Marriott Gallery August 27 - September 16, 2018.
 2017 Salon Des Refuses, Charles Darwin University, Darwin
 2017 Get it On 2017, Aboriginal Bush Traders, Darwin
 2017 Mayhmayh -Different Birds, Works on paper, bark and hollow logs, Nomad Art Gallery, Darwin
 2016 Interiors-Fabric panels, Framed the Darwin Gallery
 2016 Salon Des Refuses, Charles Darwin University, Darwin
 2016 Kunwinkju Counting Book Exhibition and Launch, Nomad Art Gallery, Darwin
 2016 12th Festival of Pacific Art - Group Exhibition, Guam Museum, Guam
 2015 Wearables, Tactile Arts Gallery, Darwin
 2015 Salon Des Refuses, Darwin Waterfront, Darwin
 2015 Dolobbo: Contemporary Bark Paintings from Injalak Arts, Aboriginal & Pacific Art, Sydney
 2013 Wurrkabal, Netanya Resort, Noosa QLD
 2013 Injalak Arts Exhibition, Better World Arts, Port Adelaide
 2009 Ochre and Rust, Indigenart Gallery, Perth
 2008 Sex, Spirits & Sorcery, Mossenson Galleries, Melbourne
 2007 Continuity, Country and Culture: Three Generations
 2007 The Injalak Hill Suite, Abiriginal & Pacific Art Gallery, Danks St Sydney
 2006 Paper, Bark, Canvas & Twine, Dickerson Gallery, Melbourne
 2006: Making Contact. Solo Exhibition. Mossenson Galleries, Melbourne, September 26–October 22, 2006.
 2006 Wet and Dry, Indigenart Gallery, Perth WA
 2006 24th National Aboriginal & Torres Strait Islander Art Award, MAGNT, Darwin NT
 2006 The Second Peter Baillie Acquisitive Award, Flinders University, Adelaide SA
 2005 Concord, Framed Gallery, Darwin
 2004 21st Telstra National Aboriginal & Torres Strait Islander Art Award
 2003 Art Mob Exhibition Tasmania
 2003 20th Telstra National Aboriginal & Torres Strait Islander Art Award
 2001 Telstra National Aboriginal and Torres Strait Islander Art Award
 1998 Desert Designs Japingka Gallery, Perth WA
 1996 Framed Gallery, Darwin NT
 1995 21st Telstra National Aboriginal & Torres Strait Islander Art Award
 1995 The Twelfth National Aboriginal Art Award Exhibition,, Museums and Art Galleries of the Northern Territory Darwin
 1994 Aboriginal & Tribal Art Gallery The Rocks Sydney NSW
 1993 Editions, Southbank, Melbourne Vic
 1993 Hogarth Aboriginal and Tribal Art Gallery
 1993 Stories, Contemporary Australian Aboriginal Art Kerava Art
 1993 Helsinki and Rovaniemi Art Museum Lappland, Finland
 1993 Burukmarri Gallery, Fremantle WA

References

Further reading 

 "Down under, up above: A wealth of Indigenous Australian art comes to Charlottesville this winter". C-VILLE Weekly. 2020-01-22. Retrieved 2020-03-30.
Hausman, Sandy. "Aboriginal Art Is Center Stage in Charlotteville". www.wvtf.org. Retrieved 2020-03-30.
Skerritt, Henry. ""Is Art History Any Use to Aboriginal Artists? Gabriel Maralngurra's Contact Paintings."". Double Desire: Transculturation and Indigenous Contemporary Art, edited by Ian McLean, 223-241. Newcastle: Cambridge Scholars Publishing, 2014.

Loos, Ted (2020-03-10). "Richly Decorated Memorials Emerge From Ancient Traditions". The New York Times. Retrieved 2020-03-30.
Sanz, Inés Domingo; Fiore, Dánae; May, Sally K. (2016-07). Archaeologies of Art: Time, Place, and Identity. Routledge. Retrieved 2020-03-30.
“Seeing Through Spencer: Gabriel Maralngurra's Paintings of Baldwin Spencer.” Pacific Arts: The Journal of the Pacific Arts Association, 14, no.1-2 (2015): 106–119.
"Stay Local, Play Local: Aboriginal Art on Display". www.cbs19news.com. Retrieved 2020-03-30

1968 births
People from the Northern Territory
Indigenous Australian artists
Living people